The following is a list of players, both past and current, who appeared at least in one game for the TNT Tropang Giga PBA franchise.

A

B

C

D

E

F

G

H

J

K

L

M

N

O

P

Q

R

S

T

V

W

Y

References